The Letov Š-25 was a Czechoslovak single-engined, two-seat biplane trainer. It was designed by Alois Smolík at Letov Kbely.

Design
The Š-25 was a biplane trainer with a metal frame and linen skin. It competed with the A-46 and BH-41 for the Czechoslovak Air Force contract for a new trainer aircraft. Although displaying good flight characteristics and short takeoff and landing, the Š-25 lost out to the BH-41.

Specifications

References

External links
  Letov Š-25

1920s Czechoslovakian military trainer aircraft
Š-25
Biplanes
Aircraft first flown in 1930